Leslie Cheung Kwok-wing (12 September 1956 – 1 April 2003) was a Hong Kong singer and actor. Throughout a 26-year career from 1977 until his death, Cheung released over 40 music albums and acted in 56 films. He was one of the most prominent pioneers that shaped the identity of Cantopop during the 1980s and became known for his flamboyant, often outrageous stage appearance. His venture into acting in the 1990s was recognised for his portrayal of queer characters in a then-conservative film industry. His career was marked with both praise and criticism, with numerous public discussions focusing on his sexual orientation and androgynous persona.

Born Cheung Fat-chung in Kowloon, British Hong Kong, Cheung studied in England from the age of 12 until returning to Hong Kong in 1976 to pursue a career in show business. He achieved wide popularity with his 1984 self-titled album and its single "Monica", whose upbeat dance production introduced a new popular trend to Cantopop in addition to the contemporary pool of sentimental ballads. Cheung's continued success with a string of hit albums in the mid- and late-1980s, most notably 1987 best-seller Summer Romance, won him numerous awards, including Most Popular Male Artist at the 1988 and 1989 Jade Solid Gold Best Ten Music Awards. In addition to music, Cheung had breakthrough film roles as a disillusioned teenager in Nomad (1982) and as a police officer torn between justice and brotherhood in A Better Tomorrow (1986). He announced his "retirement" from music and emigrated to Canada in 1989, but remained active in his burgeoning acting career.

Cheung achieved widespread recognition as an actor in the 1990s. He played a womaniser longing for the return of his estranged mother in Days of Being Wild (1990), which won him Best Actor at the 1991 Hong Kong Film Awards. His role as a gay Peking opera actor in Farewell My Concubine (1993) catapulted him to prominence in the western world. Cheung's reputation as a queer celebrity consolidated with his role in the 1997 drama Happy Together, a film explicitly depicting a gay male relationship. His comeback as a recording artist in the late 1990s, particularly with his 1996 album Red, was noted for sonic experimentation and extravagant, graphic imagery. He was awarded the Golden Needle Award, the highest distinction of the RTHK Top 10 Gold Songs Awards, in 1999. In 2000, he was honoured as "Asia's Biggest Superstar" at the CCTV/MTV Music Honours in mainland China. Cheung died by suicide by jumping off the 24th floor of the hotel Mandarin Oriental on 1 April 2003, having been diagnosed with severe clinical depression.

Early life

Cheung was born Cheung Fat-chung in Kowloon, British Hong Kong, the youngest of 10 children in a middle-class Hakka family. His father, Cheung Wut-hoi, was a well-known tailor specialised in suits whose customers included Western celebrities such as film director Alfred Hitchcock and actors Marlon Brando and Cary Grant. Despite his father's reputation in the fashion industry, Cheung was uninspired by the profession. Cheung told many interviewers that he had an unhappy childhood, feeling emotionally estranged from his father and siblings, and frequently witnessing arguments and fights in the household. He felt "depressed sometimes" and longed for affection from his parents who were absent from home most of the time in his childhood. His father's abusive treatment of his mother had a lasting effect on Cheung's perspectives on marriage. When Cheung's father married another woman, his emotional life further deteriorated. He was brought up by his grandmother, whom he was very close with. Cheung summed up his upbringing as a "silent resentment" with "nothing worth remembering", except for the death of his grandmother when he was in primary school, which was the "one thing that I do remember about my childhood."

Cheung attended Rosaryhill School for secondary education in Hong Kong and, at age 12, enrolled at an independent boys boarding school Eccles Hall School Quideham near Norwich in England. During his time at Rosaryhill, Cheung was academically poor but excelled in the English language. He discovered a newfound interest in Western films and immersed himself in music, studying the original soundtrack of Romeo and Juliet. When in England, he recalled that there were "racial problems", but managed to make friends. During weekends, he worked as a bartender and would sometimes do amateur singing at his relatives' restaurant in Southend-on-Sea. He came across the film Gone with the Wind and chose Leslie as his English name inspired by the actor Leslie Howard, feeling that "The name can be a man's or woman's, it's very unisex." Cheung attended the University of Leeds, where he studied textile management. After one year of study, in 1976, he returned to Hong Kong when his father became paralysed on one side of the body after a stroke. As the father wanted all of his children to be at home, Cheung abandoned his study and became a salesman for Levi's for a living. Cheung recalled that during this time, "I had no plans; there I was, feeling like I was hanging in the middle of nowhere."

Career

Beginnings
Upon returning to Hong Kong, Cheung went back to high school as a mature student and formed a band, where he was the lead singer, with his classmates. In May 1977, the band members signed up individually for Rediffusion Television (RTV)'s Asian Singing Contest. Only Cheung remained until the final round of the Hong Kong division, where he finished as the first runner-up with a rendition of "American Pie". He proceeded to the pan-Asian division, finishing fifth. Soon after the competition, RTV offered Cheung a three-year contract as a second-rate actor for RTV. He also signed with Polydor Records with hopes of releasing music albums.

Cheung's career in show business did not take off immediately. His first film role was in Erotic Dream of the Red Chamber (1978), a softcore porn production that features his bare buttocks. His first two albums were solely recorded in English, and his third album, Lover's Arrow (1979) was recorded in Cantonese. The albums failed commercially, and critics lambasted Cheung's voice as "chicken-like". Cheung's first public performance at the 1977 Hong Kong Pop Folk Music Festival was booed off the stage by the audience. He described his early days into show business as "full of uncertainty ... I remember well that my singing career at the early stage was like 'a person running into a rock', full of despair and obstacles." Seeing little potential in Cheung, Polydor allowed him to depart on his own terms.

1982–1989: Cantopop success and film crossover
Cheung signed with Capital Artists, a record label closely associated with the then-dominant television network TVB, in 1982. His first hit single, "The Wind Blows On" (1982), is a cover version of Momoe Yamaguchi's Japanese single "The Other Side of Goodbye" . The song was successful on charts, revitalising Cheung's image as a Cantopop singer. The titular album was Cheung's first to be certified gold by the International Federation of the Phonographic Industry (IFPI) Hong Kong. His second album with Capital, Craziness (1983), is a compilation of songs he recorded for TVB dramas. The album was also a success, receiving a gold certification from the IFPI Hong Kong. He continued his movie crossover with roles mostly in teenage films, and earned his first major recognition for starring in Nomad (1982). While Cheung had already been a well-known actor with likeable personae in TVB productions, his role as a disillusioned teenager in Nomad foresaw his future reputation as an icon of rebel. The role garnered Cheung a nomination for Best Actor at the 1983 Hong Kong Film Awards.

The year 1984 was when Cheung achieved mass stardom. He released the hit single "Monica", a cover of the single by Japanese singer Kōji Kikkawa. The song topped charts in Hong Kong and was one of the 10 gold-certified songs honoured at TVB's 1984 Jade Solid Gold Best Ten Music Awards and the 1984 RTHK Top 10 Gold Songs Awards. The song's upbeat dance production introduced a new musical trend to Cantopop, in addition to the traditional sentimental ballads that had dominated the scene. Cheung's 1984 self-titled album, which included "Monica", was his first to be certified platinum by the IFPI Hong Kong and sold over 200,000 copies. He starred in the TVB drama Once Upon an Ordinary Girl and the film Behind the Yellow Line. In the latter, he co-starred with actress Maggie Cheung and singer-actress Anita Mui. Both productions were commercially successful and put Cheung into the limelight as a prominent entertainer. As Cheung's fame expanded, the media began to pit him against fellow singer-actor Alan Tam, as the two were the most successful male Cantopop singers at the moment. The publicised so-called rivalry contributed to Cantopop's booming sales and lasted until the end of the 1980s.

Cheung's next albums with Capital were met with similar success. For Your Heart Only (1985) yielded the hit single "Wild Wind", which was among the 10 gold-certified songs honoured at both TVB's Jade Solid Gold and RTHK Top 10 awards. The album also included songs Cheung recorded for TVB dramas, propelling his image as a romantic male lead. His 1986 single "Who Feels the Same?" won the Gold Song Gold Award, the distinction for the most popular song of the year, at TVB's Jade Solid Gold Awards. With this achievement, Cheung became an arguably undisputed royalty of Cantopop. After the release of "Who Feels the Same?", he left Capital and joined Cinepoly Records. A turning point in his burgeoning acting career was in the John Woo-directed 1986 crime-action A Better Tomorrow, in which he co-starred with Ti Lung and Chow Yun-fat. He played a youthful and impulsive police officer torn between justice and his criminal brother.

Cheung's career ascended to a new peak in 1987, when he released his first album under Cinepoly, Summer Romance. The album was the best-selling Cantopop release of the year, earning seven times platinum certification from the IFPI Hong Kong and sold over 350,000 copies. Its lead single, "Sleepless Night", won the Gold Song Gold Award at the 1987 Jade Solid Gold Awards. The next two albums, Virgin Snow and Hot Summer, both were released in 1988 and sold well, receiving gold and platinum certifications from the IFPI Hong Kong. He also had starring roles in the films A Chinese Ghost Story and Rouge. The performance of Cheung and his co-star Anita Mui in Rouge consolidated the pair's reputation as the top Hong Kong entertainers. Yiu-wai Chu, author of the book Hong Kong Cantopop: A Concise History (2017), noted that Cheung and Mui formed an "unprecedented" chemistry showcasing "mystic power of charisma", not only in films but also on stage performances together. The two were also close friends in real life.

Cheung embarked on a 23-date tour at the Hong Kong Coliseum in mid-1988, sponsored by Pepsi. The tour was a sold-out and accumulated over 250,000 spectators. He also held several shows catering to the Chinese community in North America, visiting Atlantic City, Calgary, Toronto, and Vancouver. In the wake of the intense political atmosphere in mainland China in the late 1980s, which would culminate in the 1989 Tiananmen Square protests, successful Cantopop singers announced public withdrawal from the music industry and emigrated to western countries. Cheung followed suit, announcing his "retirement" from Cantopop and emigrating to Vancouver, Canada in 1989. Prior to his retirement, Cheung released three further albums under Cinepoly—Leslie '89, Salute, Final Encounter—all of which received platinum certifications from the IFPI Hong Kong. He won Most Popular Male Artist twice, at the 1988 and 1989 Jade Solid Gold Best Ten Music Awards. His "farewell concert tour", in support of the album Final Encounter, ran for 33 consecutive sold-out shows at the Hong Kong Coliseum. Cheung donated profits of his 1989 album Salute to the Hong Kong Academy for Performing Arts, which was named the Leslie Cheung Memorial Scholarship after his death.

1990–1995: Music hiatus and major film roles

In addition to music, Cheung had his breakthrough movie role in the crime-action A Better Tomorrow (1986), which would pave the way for his upcoming career in cinema. Cheung announced his "retirement" and emigrated to Canada in 1989, in the aftermath of the handover of Hong Kong, but subsequently returned to show business in 1990.

He also won Best Actor at the 1994 Hong Kong Film Critics Society Awards in the comedy-drama Ashes of Time (1994).

The turning point in Cheung's acting career came in 1986 with his starring role in John Woo's A Better Tomorrow, which broke Hong Kong's box office record. In the following years, Cheung was praised for his performances in films which found popularity with audiences worldwide, including A Chinese Ghost Story (1987), Rouge (1987), Wong Kar-Wai's Days of Being Wild (1991) and Farewell My Concubine (1993).

Although Cheung quit his career as a pop singer from 1989 to 1995, he continued his music career as a songwriter. He composed more than ten songs during that time. In 1993, he won Best Original Movie Song Award from Golden Horse Film Festival for the theme song Red Cheek, White Hair for The Bride with White Hair (as a film score composer). In 1995, he wrote all three theme songs for the film The Phantom Lover. As for songwriting, Cheung won four nominations for Best Original Movie Song Award at the Golden Horse Film Festival and Awards and two nominations for Best Original Film Song at the Hong Kong Film Awards. In 1998, he was a member of the jury at the 48th Berlin International Film Festival.

1995–1999: Return to music

In 1995 Cheung signed a contract with Rock Records, returning to music as a singer. At the same year, he released his first post-"retirement" album, Beloved. Beloved achieved large market success with the award of IFPI Best Selling Album.

In 2001, Cheung collaborated with William Chang, the art director of Wong Kar-Wai's Days of Being Wild (1991), to make his music video Bewildered, about the intimacy between two gay men. Japanese ballet dancer Nishijima Kazuhiro played Cheung's lover in the video. The music video was demonised for advocating homosexuality and was banned by TVB, but Cheung refused to edit the scenes and censor himself.

2000–2003: Later years
Cheung's last concert tour was the Passion Tour, which took place in Hong Kong and overseas from 2000 to 2001. Cheung collaborated with fashion designer Jean Paul Gaultier, transforming Cheung "From Angel to Devil" in four costumes: the Angel, the Pretty Boy, the Latin Lover, and the Devil – denoting cross-cultural drag and focusing on Cheung's androgyny and bisexuality. Although Passion Tour was acclaimed in Japan, Korea, and Canada for Cheung's glamour and dignity in using drag performance through Gaultier's costume designs, in Hong Kong it was received with disapproval. His final concert tour, the Passion Tour (2000–01), visited Asia, the United Kingdom, and the United States. The tour broke attendance records throughout Asia, including a record for the first foreign artist to hold 16 concerts in Japan.

While Cheung could sell well over 200,000 copies for an album in his 1980s' heydays, his later albums struggled to match the same success with sales of 50,000 copies each.

In 2011, CCTV commented the "Passion Tour" that from performance form, art concept, costume props and audience response, all represent the highest standard of Chinese concerts, no one has ever surpassed.

Personal life
In 1977, during the filming of the RTV television series Love Story, the then 20-year-old Cheung met and fell in love with his 17-year-old co-star, Teresa Mo (毛舜筠), and they got together after they finished the series. In 1979, Cheung proposed to Mo with flowers, but his sudden proposal startled her and she began to distance herself from him. Although Cheung and Teresa Mo eventually broke up after the proposal and briefly lost contact, they remained close friends after they had reunited for the 1992 film All's Well, Ends Well.

Cheung later went into a brief relationship with an actress , the younger sister of Michelle Yim, but they broke up in 1980, due to their incompatibility  for each other's lifestyles.

Cheung and Ngai Sze-pui, a Hong Kong model and actress whom he met on the set of ATV television series Agency 24, were in a relationship for two years from 1981 to 1983.

In 1984, at the house of Albert Yeung, Cheung met Cindy Yeung (楊諾詩), the youngest daughter of Albert Yeung who had recently returned from Boston. Cindy Yeung was also a fan of Cheung and was seven years younger than him. Cheung and Yeung went out on several dates until the latter returned to Boston. They continued their relationship through phone calls and letters, but would part ways in the following year, still remaining good friends. Cheung felt that if he had not been in the showbusiness, he could have already been married with children, like most of his friends.

In an interview in 1992, Cheung stated that "My mind is bisexual. It's easy for me to love a woman. It's also easy for me to love a man, too" and "I believe that a good actor would be androgynous, and ever changing."

He announced his same-sex relationship with his childhood friend Daffy Tong Hok-tak (唐鶴德) during a concert in 1997. He dedicated a love song to the two "lovers of his life", his mother and his boyfriend Daffy Tong at that concert, which is seen as the moment he came out of the closet. This action earned him prestige in LGBT communities in China, Japan, Taiwan, and Hong Kong. His relationship with Daffy lasted until his death in 2003.

Cheung responded to questions regarding his love life: "In terms of lovers, I think I can be a better friend than a lover. Because I am a workaholic. To share my romance, that person has to compromise something." This statement was out during the interview following the release of the film Okinawa Rendez-vous in 2000.

In a 2001 interview with Time magazine, Cheung said: "It's more appropriate to say I'm bisexual. I've had girlfriends. When I was 22 or so, I asked my girlfriend Teresa Mo to marry me."

Citizenship
Leslie Cheung moved to Vancouver in 1990 and became a Canadian citizen by naturalisation.

Philanthropy
Cheung was a supporter of several charities concerning children's welfare. He was a patron of the Children's Cancer Foundation, a charity that cares for young children with cancer and their families. Cheung donated HK$1 million (US$128,000) in 1996 and launched five sets of RED cards to help raise funds for the Children's Cancer Foundation.

He was the first Cantopop star to launch a charity fundraising at a concert. In 1996, although he rarely sang in public at that time, he sang three theme songs from his films to raise money for the elderly.

For his 1997 concert at the HK Coliseum, Cheung set up a collection booth for the RED Card charity. Donations of HK$100 or above could obtain a set of cards. Cheung said, "I will lead the way, so I donated HK$1,000,000 to Hong Kong children's cancer fund in my own name." The concert raised more than HK$800,000, to which Cheung and his friends added more than HK$100,000, and made up a million Hong Kong dollars to donate to the cancer fund.

He was also a patron of the End Child Sexual Abuse Foundation (ECSAF) (護苗基金), founded by veteran actress Josephine Siao.

In 1999, at a party to raise relief funds in the aftermath of the Taiwan earthquake, Cheung participated in a fried rice tasting event. He donated HK$250,000 for a bowl of rice; this was matched by fan donations, bringing the total to HK$500,000.

In 2000, Sun Entertainment opened the "Star Second-hand Shop", where second-hand goods donated by celebrities were auctioned to raise money for the "Sun Love Fund".  Leslie Cheung was known for his very good fashion sense and he was the first to donate three well-loved, carefully selected pieces to the auction. Leslie also donated his beloved badminton racket to IDclub Taiwan, to be auctioned to raise money for the children's cancer fund.

In 1999 and 2000, he appeared in TVB charity shows to help raise funds for ECSAF, in which he was appointed a goodwill ambassador in 2002.

In 2003, Cheung donated HK$100,000 to the Seedling protection fund, who were holding a large-scale charity night on the 12th of March. He told his party guests to give him cash instead of presents, then he donated all of the money that he received to the fund.

Death and legacy

Cheung died by suicide on 1 April 2003 at 6:43 pm (HKT). He leapt from the 24th floor of the Mandarin Oriental hotel, located in the Central district of Hong Kong Island. He left a suicide note saying that he had been suffering from depression.

As one of the most popular performers in Asia, Cheung's death broke the hearts of millions of his fans across Asia and shocked the Asian entertainment industry and Chinese community worldwide. The day after Cheung's death, his partner Daffy Tong confirmed that Cheung suffered from clinical depression and had been seeing Professor Felice Lieh Mak, a famous therapist, for treatment for almost a year. He also revealed that Cheung had previously attempted suicide in November 2002. Later at his funeral, Cheung's niece disclosed that her uncle had severe clinical depression and suffered much over the past year. He was buried in Po Fook Hill, Shatin.

Despite the risk of infection from SARS and the WHO's warning on traveling to Hong Kong, tens of thousands attended Cheung's memorial service, which was held for the public, on 7 April 2003, including celebrities and other fans, many from other parts of the world such as mainland China, Taiwan, Korea, Japan, Southeast Asia, the United States, and Canada. Cheung's funeral was held on 8 April 2003. For almost a month, Cheung's death dominated newspaper headlines in Hong Kong and his songs were constantly on the air. His final album, Everything Follows the Wind, was released three months after his death.

Cheung's suicide note (translation):

In a 2012 interview, Cheung's eldest sister, Ophelia, stated Cheung was diagnosed with clinical depression caused by a chemical imbalance in the brain. She said that reporters were frequently found outside of her brother's home which hampered his ability to get to his doctor's facility. Thus, he would come over to her house to consult with his doctor. He would ask his sister, "Why am I depressed? I have money and so many people love me." He was reluctant to take medication for his depression.

In 2013, Cheung's former music agent Florence Chan organised two memorial concerts entitled Miss You Much Leslie on 31 March and 1 April for the 10th anniversary of Cheung's death. Big names of the Hong Kong entertainment industry performed at the concert at Hong Kong Coliseum. In addition, in 2013, Cheung's fans from around the world made two million orizuru cranes for the Guinness World Record as a tribute to the anniversary.

On 12 September 2016, on what would have been Cheung's 60th birthday, over one thousand fans joined Florence Chan in the morning at Po Fook Hill Ancestral Hall (寶福山) for prayers. At night, Cheung's fans club, Red Mission organised "Leslie Cheung 60th Red Hot Birthday Party" to commemorate Cheung. It was an outdoor birthday party at Central Harbourfront Event Space with a big LED screen projecting Cheung's past video clips, concerts, songs and pictures. Eason Chan as a member of Red Mission joined the party singing Cheung's song "4 season" (春夏秋冬) as a tribute to Cheung. In the same month, another fans club, United Leslie also celebrated the big day of this renowned star. United Leslie organised an exhibition and movie screening of Cheung's two selected movies in PMQ, Central of Hong Kong.

On 1 April 2022, 8pm, Leslie Cheung's Passion Tour concert remastered in 4K was released online to mark the 19th anniversary of the Canto-pop star's death. The remastered concert was live streamed on Tencent Video and WeChat platforms with enhanced visual image thanks to AI technology performed by Tencent Media Lab.

Struggling with Hong Kong media and social prejudice 
Cheung is well known for his prominent roles portraying queer characters in Happy Together and Farewell My Concubine. A pair of red high heels Cheung wore during a performance of his song Red were described as "a top draw" at an exhibit on androgynous fashion in Hong Kong.  Many media outlets focused primarily on arguing about his queer identity instead of on his artistic achievement in film and music. Before his death, Cheung mentioned in interviews that he had become depressed because of negative comments about gender-crossing in his Passion Tour concert. He had planned to retire from stage performance because of the strain of being a bisexual artist in Hong Kong, facing stigmatisation, surveillance, and marginalisation.

Asteroid 
In 2018, 55383 Cheungkwokwing was named in memory of Leslie Cheung. The main-belt asteroid was discovered by Bill Yeung at the Desert Eagle Observatory in 2003.

Awards and nominations

RTHK Top 10 Gold Songs Awards (十大中文金曲)

Jade Solid Gold Best Ten Music Awards (十大勁歌金曲頒獎典禮)

Other music awards

Hong Kong Film Awards

Golden Horse Awards

Other film awards

Ming Pao Power Academy Awards

Discography

Filmography

See also
Cinema of Hong Kong
Music of Hong Kong

References

Notes

Citations

Bibliography

Further reading
Simon Broughton, Mark Ellingham, World Music Volume 2: Latin and North America, Caribbean, India, Asia and Pacific, BBC Radio, 2000, 
Kei Mori, "夢想之欠片 (Broken pieces of dreams)", Renga Shyobo Shinshya Co Ltd, Tokyo, Japan, 2004, 
Chitose Shima, "Leslie Cheung Interview", All About Leslie, p25–40, Sangyo Henshu Center Co., Ltd., Tokyo, Japan, 1999, 
Chitose Shima, Time of Leslie Cheung, Sangyo Henshu Center Co., Ltd., Tokyo, Japan, 2004, 

City Entertainment Editor Committee, Leslie Cheung's Movie World 2 (1991–1995), City Entertainment, Hong Kong, 2006, 
De Hui, Leslie Cheung's Movie Life I, II, Shanghai Bookstore Publishing House, Shanghai, 2006, .

Helen Hok-Sze Leung, "In Queer Memory: Leslie Cheung (1956-2003)" In  "Undercurrents Queer Culture and Postcolonial Hong Kong", UBC Press, Vancouver, 2008, p. 85 -105,

External links

  	 
|-
! colspan="3" style="background: #DAA520;" | Hong Kong Film Awards
|-

|-
! colspan="3" style="background: #DAA520;" | Hong Kong Film Critics Society Awards
|-

|-
! colspan="3" style="background: #DAA520;" | RTHK Top 10 Gold Songs Awards
|-

|-
! colspan="3" style="background: #DAA520;" | Jade Solid Gold Best Ten Music Awards
|-

|-
! colspan="3" style="background: #DAA520;" | Ultimate Song Chart Awards
|-

|-
! colspan="3" style="background: #DAA520;" | Ming Pao Power Academy Awards
|-

 
1956 births
2003 deaths
2003 suicides
20th-century Hong Kong male actors
20th-century Hong Kong male singers
21st-century Hong Kong male actors
21st-century Hong Kong male singers
Alumni of the University of Leeds
Bisexual male actors
Bisexual men
Bisexual singers
Bisexual songwriters
Canadian male actors of Hong Kong descent
Canadian musicians of Hong Kong descent
Cantopop singers
Hong Kong emigrants to Canada
Hong Kong idols
Hong Kong male film actors
Hong Kong male singers
Hong Kong male television actors
Hong Kong Mandopop singers
English-language singers from Hong Kong
Hong Kong people of Hakka descent
Hong Kong songwriters
LGBT-related suicides
Hong Kong LGBT singers
Hong Kong LGBT actors
Hong Kong LGBT songwriters
Hong Kong bisexual people
Male actors from Vancouver
Musicians from Vancouver
Naturalized citizens of Canada
People educated at Norwich School
People from Kowloon
Suicides by jumping in Hong Kong
20th-century Hong Kong LGBT people
21st-century Hong Kong LGBT people